David Morrill is a New Hampshire politician.

Education
Morrill earned a B.S. from Keene State College in graphic design and earned an M.B.A. from Antioch University New England.

Career
On November 6, 2018, Morrill was elected to the New Hampshire House of Representatives where he represents the Cheshire 4 district. Morrill assumed office on December 5, 2018. Morrill is a Democrat.

Personal life
Morrill resides in Keene, New Hampshire.

References

Living people
People from Keene, New Hampshire
Keene State College alumni
Antioch University New England alumni
Democratic Party members of the New Hampshire House of Representatives
21st-century American politicians
Year of birth missing (living people)